The Marion County Courthouse is located in Salem, Oregon, United States.

The building underwent repairs in 2006 after being damaged by a truck.

See also
 World War I Memorial (Salem, Oregon)

References

External links
 

Buildings and structures in Salem, Oregon
County courthouses in Oregon